The men's 400 metres hurdles was an event at the 1972 Summer Olympics in Munich. The competition was held on 31 August - 2 September. There were 37 competitors from 25 nations. The maximum number of athletes per nation had been set at 3 since the 1930 Olympic Congress. The event was won by John Akii-Bua of Uganda, the nation's first medal in the event and first gold medal in any Olympic event. Ralph Mann returned the United States to the podium after a one-Games absence with his silver medal, while David Hemery added a bronze to his 1968 gold to become the fifth man (and first non-American) to earn multiple medals in the event while extending Great Britain's podium streak in the 400 metres hurdles to three Games.

Background

This was the 15th time the event was held. It had been introduced along with the men's 200 metres hurdles in 1900, with the 200 being dropped after 1904 and the 400 being held through 1908 before being left off the 1912 programme. However, when the Olympics returned in 1920 after World War I, the men's 400 metres hurdles was back and would continue to be contested at every Games thereafter.

Four of the eight finalists from the 1968 Games returned: gold medalist David Hemery and bronze medalist John Sherwood of Great Britain, seventh-place finisher Rainer Schubert of West Germany, and eighth-place finisher Roberto Frinolli of Italy. Hemery was one of the favorites, along with Ralph Mann of the United States, who had won the American championship from 1969 to 1971 as well as the U.S. trials. Uganda's John Akii-Bua had run the fastest time in 1971, but had little competitive experience.

Madagascar, Nigeria, and Spain each made their debut in the event; East Germany competed separately for the first time. The United States made its 15th appearance, the only nation to have competed at every edition of the event to that point.

Competition format

The competition used the three-round format used every Games since 1908 (except the four-round competition in 1952): quarterfinals, semifinals, and a final. Ten sets of hurdles were set on the course. The hurdles were 3 feet (91.5 centimetres) tall and were placed 35 metres apart beginning 45 metres from the starting line, resulting in a 40 metres home stretch after the last hurdle. The 400 metres track was standard.

There were 5 quarterfinal heats with 7 or 8 athletes each. The top 3 men in each quarterfinal advanced to the semifinals, along with the next fastest hurdler overall. The 16 semifinalists were divided into 2 semifinals of 8 athletes each, with the top 4 in each semifinal advancing to the 8-man final.

Records

Prior to the competition, the existing world and Olympic records were as follows.

John Akii-Bua was the first to run the event in under 48 seconds, setting a new world record in the final with a time of 47.82 seconds.

Schedule

All times are Central European Time (UTC+1)

Results

Quarterfinals

The top three runners in each of the five heats (blue) and the next fastest (green), advanced to the semifinal round.

Quarterfinal 1

Quarterfinal 2

Quarterfinal 3

Quarterfinal 4

Quarterfinal 5

Semifinals

The top four in each of the two heats advanced to the final round.

Semifinal 1

Semifinal 2

Final

Results summary

References

External links
Official report

Men's 400 metres hurdles
400 metres hurdles at the Olympics
Men's events at the 1972 Summer Olympics